The Mananara River is one of the main rivers in north-eastern Madagascar.  Its mouth is located in the Bay of Antongil, (Indian Ocean) near the city of Mananara Nord in the Analanjirofo region.

References
Aldegheri, Marius.  Rivers and Streams on Madagascar, in Battistini, Rene & G. Richard-Vindard (ed.), Biogeography and Ecology in Madagascar, p. 266-67 (1972))

Rivers of Madagascar
 Rivers of Analanjirofo